Daniel Pon Mony (born 12 August 1921) was an Indian weightlifter. He competed at the 1948 Summer Olympics and the 1952 Summer Olympics.

References

External links
  

1921 births
Possibly living people
Indian male weightlifters
Olympic weightlifters of India
Weightlifters at the 1948 Summer Olympics
Weightlifters at the 1952 Summer Olympics
Weightlifters at the 1951 Asian Games
Asian Games competitors for India